Joseph Fan Heng'an (16 October 1882 - 1975) was a Chinese Catholic priest and Bishop of the Roman Catholic Diocese of Jining between 1933 and 1975.

Biography
Fan was born in Chongli County, Hebei on October 16, 1882, during the late Qing dynasty (1644–1911). He was ordained a priest on September 24, 1910. On January 10, 1933, he was appointed titular bishop and apostolic vicar by the Roman Catholic Diocese of Jining. He was ordained bishop on June 11 of that year in St. Peter's Basilica in Rome by Pope Pius XI. When Jining was elevated to the diocese on April 11, 1946, he became bishop. He died in 1975.

References

1882 births
1975 deaths
People from Zhangjiakou
20th-century Roman Catholic bishops in China